Nicholas Foulkes is an English historian, author, and journalist. He has written extensively about 19th-century social history as well as the history of luxury goods. Robb Report included his book, The Impossible Collection of Watches, in a list of "5 Books Every Watch Collector Should Own," and his book, Swans —Legends of the Jet Society, was optioned for production as a TV series.

Education
Mr. Foulkes attended Christ's Hospital and Hertford College, Oxford at the University of Oxford, where he graduated in 1983.

Honours
In 2007, Foulkes was named Havana Man of the Year (Habano Hombre del Año) in the Communications category.

In 2021, Foulkes was named President of the Jury for the 2021 Grand Prix d'Horlogerie de Genève, intended to highlight and annually reward the excellence of the watchmaking art.

Personal life 
One of Nicholas’ son, Max Foulkes, works with the Sahakians at Davidoff of London. Nicholas and Max started their own father and son Youtube channel, where they share and discuss cigars and great conversation.

Bibliography
Scandalous Society: Passion and Celebrity in the Nineteenth Century (2004)
Dancing into Battle: A social history of the battle of Waterloo (2007)
High Society: The History of America’s Upper Class (2008)
Gentlemen and Blackguards: Gambling mania and the plot to steal the derby of 1844 (2011)
Swans: Legends of the Jet Society (2013)
The Impossible Collection of Watches (2014)
Bernard Buffet: The Invention of the Modern Mega-Artist (2016)
Patek Philippe: The Authorized Biography (2016)
Cigars: A Guide (2017)
Automata : A Brief History of the Automata from Ancient Times to the Fée Ondine (2017)
Time Tamed (2019)
Ira: The Life and Times of a Princess (2019)
Jaeger LeCoultre: Reverso (2020)

References

English journalists
Living people
1960s births
People educated at Christ's Hospital
Alumni of Hertford College, Oxford